Anayampatti S. Ganesan (born 22 May 1932) is a Carnatic musician from South India. He was born in Chennai.

Ganesan, who lives in Chennai, plays the jal tarang or jalatharangam in concerts throughout Southern India, and is also a carnatic vocalist and violinist. In Madras' 2005-2006 concert season. His jal tarang is "a set of 19 antique porcelain bowls from China that are 100 years old".

References

A Dictionary of South Indian Music and Musicians (3 Vols-Set) :  P. Sambamurthy, Indian Music Pub, 2001, pbk, Reprint, 535 p, 3 Vols.
A Comprehensive Dictionary of Carnatic Music : Dictionary, Concepts, Charts, Ragas, Thalas, Compositions, Instruments, Musical Pillars and Much More :  Vidya Bhavani Suresh, Skanda Pub, 2005, 396 p.

External links
Youtube video - Anayampatti S. Ganesan
The Music Conference 1976, The Music Academy, Madras
News in The Hindu Newspaper published in 24 August 2018
News in The Hindu Newspaper published on 5 January 2010

1932 births
Carnatic instrumentalists
Indian percussionists
Jal tarang players
Living people
Missing middle or first names